Alpha Butte is a summit in the U.S. state of Nevada.

Alpha Butte was named from its location as first in a series of hills.

References

Mountains of Humboldt County, Nevada